Abdulaziz Nasser Al Shamsi is the director of protocol at the ministry of foreign affairs in the United Arab Emirates. Al Shamsi who was born in Ajman in 1956 obtained his bachelor's degree in business administration at the University of Cairo in 1980. He is married to Hissa Abdulla Ahmed Al-Otaiba.

Diplomatic career 
 Ambassador Extraordinary and Plenipotentiary to Italy (From: March 2008 – Present)
 Director of Protocol (From: August 2007 to March 2008)
 Permanent Representative of the UAE to the United Nations (From: September 2001 to July 2007).
 Director, Department of International Organizations & Conferences, Ministry of Foreign Affairs (From: August 2001 to 20/05/2002).
 Ambassador Extraordinary and Plenipotentiary to France (From: 07/03/1995 to 25/08/1999).
 Represented the UAE as Permanent Representative to UNESCO (From: 07/03/1995  to 25/08/1999).
 Non-Resident Ambassador to Switzerland (From: 23/05/1997 to 25/08/1999).
 Ministry of Foreign Affairs (From: 05/10/1994 to February 1995).
 Non-Resident Ambassador to Chile (From: 09/12/1993 to 05/10/1994).
 Non-Resident Ambassador to Argentina (From: 22/03/1993 to 05/10/1994).
 Ambassador Extraordinary and Plenipotentiary to Brazil (From: 14/06/1991 to 05/10/1994).
  Promoted to Minister Plenipotentiary with title of Ambassador on 21/01/1991.
 Appointed Deputy Director of the Department of Arab Nations Ministry of Foreign Affairs on 13/10/1990.
 Promoted to Counsellor on 30/12/1989.
 Promoted to First Secretary on 16/02/1986.
 Transferred to the Permanent Mission of the United Arab Emirates in Geneva from 22/03/1985.
 Transferred to the Embassy of the United Arab Emirates in Tunisia from 28/07/1984.
 Promoted to Second Secretary on 15/11/1982.
 Transferred to the Embassy of the United Arab Emirates in Belgium on 04/03/1982.
 Appointed in the Diplomatic and Consular Section of the Ministry of Foreign Affairs as Third Secretary on 01/09/1980.

Attendance In International Conferences 

Ambassador Al-Shamsi participated in numerous conferences and meetings at Arab, Regional and International levels.

Honours & Medals 
- The Légion d'honneur from the President of France, in appreciation of his efforts towards promoting excellent relations between the UAE and France.

- The Rio Branco Club Medal of the Order of the Grand Cross from the President of Brazil.

References 

https://web.archive.org/web/20071111123047/http://www.un.int/uae/CV-E.htm

1956 births
People from the Emirate of Ajman
Emirati diplomats
Emirati politicians
Permanent Representatives of the United Arab Emirates to the United Nations
Permanent Delegates of the United Arab Emirates to UNESCO
Ambassadors of the United Arab Emirates to France
Ambassadors of the United Arab Emirates to Italy
Ambassadors of the United Arab Emirates to Switzerland
Ambassadors of the United Arab Emirates to Chile
Ambassadors of the United Arab Emirates to Brazil
Ambassadors of the United Arab Emirates to Argentina
Living people